Illusion is a 1929 American Pre-Code drama film directed by Lothar Mendes and written by Richard H. Digges Jr., E. Lloyd Sheldon and Arthur Chesney Train. The film stars Charles "Buddy" Rogers, Nancy Carroll, June Collyer, Kay Francis, Regis Toomey, Knute Erickson and Eugenie Besserer. The film was released on September 21, 1929, by Paramount Pictures.

Cast 
Charles "Buddy" Rogers as Carlee Thorpe
Nancy Carroll as Claire Jernigan
June Collyer as Hilda Schmittlap
Kay Francis as Zelda Paxton
Regis Toomey as Eric
Knute Erickson as Mr. Jacob Schmittlap
Eugenie Besserer as Mrs. Jacob Schmittlap
Maude Turner Gordon as Queen of Dalmatia
William Austin as Mr. Z
Emilie Melville as Mother Fay
Frances Raymond as Mrs. Y
Catherine Wallace as Mrs. Z
J.E. Nash as Mr. X
William McLaughlin as Mr. Y
Eddie Kane as Gus Bloomberg
Michael Visaroff as Equerry
Paul Lukas as Count Fortuny
Richard Cramer as Magus
Bessie Lyle as Consuelo
G.L. McDonnell as Jarman
Lillian Roth as Revolutionary Rhythm Dance Specialty
Harriet Spiker as A Midget
Anna Magruder as Fat Lady
Albert Wolffe as Giant

References

External links
 

1929 films
1920s English-language films
1929 drama films
Paramount Pictures films
Films directed by Lothar Mendes
American black-and-white films
1920s American films